Mahratta may refer to:

An old spelling of 
 Maratha caste, a ruling/warrior class of the Indian subcontinent
 Maratha Empire (1674–1820), India
 Marathi language and those who spoke that language, primarily residing in:
 the state of Maharashtra in India

Houses 
 Mahratta (Wahroonga), a house in Sydney, Australia

Ships 
 SS Mahratta (1891), lost on the Goodwin Sands in 1909
 SS Mahratta (1917), lost on the Goodwin Sands in 1939
 HMS Mahratta (G23), an M class destroyer torpedoed in 1944 with the loss of 220

Military units of the British Indian Army 
 5th Mahratta Light Infantry,
 103rd Mahratta Light Infantry
 105th Mahratta Light Infantry
 110th Mahratta Light Infantry
 114th Mahrattas
 116th Mahrattas
 117th Mahrattas

See also
Mahratta War (disambiguation)

Language and nationality disambiguation pages